Paula Cristina Gonçalves and Beatriz Haddad Maia were the defending champions, but Haddad Maia chose not to participate this year. Gonçalves played alongside Sanaz Marand, but lost in the first round to Sílvia Soler Espinosa and Anna Tatishvili.
Lara Arruabarrena and Tatjana Maria won the title, defeating Gabriela Cé and Andrea Gámiz in the final, 6–2, 4–6, [10–8].

Seeds

Draw

References 
 Main Draw

Copa Colsanitas - Doubles
2016 Doubles